A countercharge or counter-charge may be:
 counter-charge (bomb disposal)
 counter-charge (warfare)
 counter-accusation
 Misspelling of counterchange; in heraldry, transmuting of tinctures